Kathleen Campbell may refer to:

 Kathleen Foster Campbell, Irish-born American poet
 Kathleen Campbell (geologist), American-born New Zealand geology and astrobiology academic